Min Jin (born 24 May 1978 in Wuhan) is a Chinese football player.

Club career
Min Jin would be loaned out to Sheffield United (Hong Kong) and play within the 2008–09 Hong Kong First Division League where he made his league debut for the club against South China on September 28, 2008 in a 2-0 defeat.

References

External links
Sodasoccer

1978 births
Living people
Footballers from Wuhan
Chinese footballers
Guangzhou F.C. players
Changsha Ginde players
Jiangsu F.C. players
Shanghai Shenhua F.C. players
Expatriate footballers in Hong Kong
Chinese expatriate sportspeople in Hong Kong
Chinese Super League players
China League One players
Association football midfielders